Football at the 1912 Summer Olympics – Consolation tournament was a repechage tournament contested by the seven losing teams of the first two rounds of the main tournament. Six teams played the first round in a single-elimination format, while Hungary entered directly to the semifinals.

Hungary won the tournament after beating Austria 3–0 in the final.

First round

Austria vs Norway

Germany vs Russia

Italy vs Sweden

Semi finals

Hungary vs Germany

Austria vs Italy

Final

Final summary

References 

c
o
o
o
o
o
o